Sir Joseph Edgar Boehm, 1st Baronet,  (6 July 1834 – 12 December 1890) was an Austrian-born British medallist and sculptor, best known for the "Jubilee head" of Queen Victoria on coinage, and the statue of the Duke of Wellington at Hyde Park Corner. During his career Boehm maintained a large studio in London and produced a significant volume of public works and private commissions. A speciality of Boehm's was the portrait bust; there are many examples of these in the National Portrait Gallery. He was often commissioned by the Royal Family and members of the aristocracy to make sculptures for their parks and gardens. His works were many, and he exhibited 123 of them at the Royal Academy from 1862 to his death in 1890.

Biography

Boehm (originally "Böhm") was born in Vienna of Hungarian parentage. His father, Josef Daniel Böhm, was a court medal maker and the director of the imperial mint in Vienna. From 1848 to 1851 Boehm studied in London at Leigh's academy of art, the forerunner of the Heatherley School of Fine Art. He then returned to Vienna where he studied model making and medal design at the Academie der Bildenden Kunste before working in Italy and then, from 1859 to 1962 in Paris. In 1856, in Vienna, he was presented with the First Imperial Prize for Sculpture.

In 1862, Boehm settled in London, where he exhibited coins and medals at the 1862 International Exhibition, opened a studio and had his first work, a terracotta bust, shown at the Royal Academy. Throughout the 1860s, Boehm, who became a British subject in 1865, devoted his time to the production of portrait busts plus equestrian statues and statuettes. His portrait subjects included John Everett Millais, Stratford Canning and Charles Thomas Newton and Franz Liszt. Boehm's statuette of William Makepiece Thackeray, although completed after the author's death, was considered such a good likeness that several copies were made including examples for the Garrick Club and for the Athenaeum.

Boehm was often commissioned by members of the aristocracy to make equestrian and equine sculptures for the parks and gardens of their stately homes. His large sculpture of the stallion King Tom (1874) was commissioned by Baron Mayer Amschel de Rothschild for his new mansion, Mentmore Towers in 1873, and moved to Dalmeny House near Edinburgh in 1982. His large animal works include The Young Bull and Herdsman (1871) located at The Royal Agricultural Society of Victoria, Melbourne. The Horse and His Master (1874), sometimes known as A Clydesdale Stallion Rearing, in Malvern and Brueton Park in Solihull was exhibited at the Royal Academy in 1874 and at the 1878 Paris Universal Exposition. The work was bought by the grandson of Alfred Bird, Captain Oliver Bird for £300 in April 1944 and gifted to Solihull Council to place in one of their parks.

In 1869, Boehm's work came to the attention of Queen Victoria and he rapidly gained favour with the royal court. In 1871, he executed a statue of Victoria, in marble for Windsor Castle, which with the monument of the Prince Edward in St. George's Chapel in Windsor Castle, are considered his earliest great works. In total, throughout his career, Boehm completed over forty royal commissions. He won several commissions to create statues of Victoria to mark her Golden Jubilee, several of which were replica designs, which was a common and accepted practice at the time. Victoria made clear her approval of Boehm's work by unveiling his statues of her at Windsor and Balmoral which added to the appeal of his work to the local and colonial authorities who typically commissioned such monuments.

During his career Boehm maintained a large studio in London and produced a significant volume of work, including at least fifty-seven public statues and monuments. In total over 350 sculptures have been attributed to Boehm. In 1874 Boehm completed a substantial statue of John Bunyan (1628–1688) which was unveiled on 10 June at St Peter's Green, Bedford, by Lady Augusta Stanley, before a crowd of 10,000. There are many statues by Boehm in London. His  equestrian statue of the Duke of Wellington at Hyde Park Corner, unveiled in 1888 was commissioned to compensate for the removal of the colossal sculpture of the Duke by Matthew Cotes Wyatt from the nearby Wellington Arch to Aldershot.

Boehm's designs were used on a series of medals minted to mark events in the Queen's reign. These included the Golden Jubilee, her Diamond Jubilee and for the Visit to Ireland Medal 1900. In 1887, Boehm designed and executed the model for the dies for a series of coins known as the Jubilee coinage, commemorating the 50th anniversary of Queen Victoria's reign. The coins are signed J.E.B. below the shoulder. This design was severely criticised by his peers as well as the public and was replaced in 1893.  The coins depicted the royal arms in the Order of the Garter on the reverse. As a result, the sixpences were frequently gilded and passed off as gold half sovereigns. Therefore, the sixpence reverted to its standard design.

Boehm's early portrait busts led, later in his career, to him undertaking a total of fifty-seven church monuments and memorial works, including several in British cathedrals. For the memorial to General Charles George Gordon in St Paul's Cathedral, he carved an effigy of Gordon recumbent on a sarcophagus. On the death of Dean Stanley, Boehm was commissioned to execute his sarcophagus in Westminster Abbey. The Abbey also houses Boehm's memorials to Lord Beaconsfield and to Viscount Canning, plus his marble statue of the Earl of Shaftesbury. His monument to Archbishop Tait is in Canterbury Cathedral. A number of Boehm's sculptures were reproduced in popular small-scale bronze editions. These included the soldier figures from the Wellington monument and a St. George and the Dragon group piece.

Boehm became an Associate of the Royal Academy in 1878, was appointed sculptor-in-ordinary to the Queen in 1881 and was elected a full member of the Royal Academy in 1882. In 1889, he was created a baronet, of Wetherby Gardens in the Parish of St Mary Abbots, Kensington, in the County of London. Boehm encouraged and supported several younger artists and sculptors, most notably Édouard Lantéri, Alfred Gilbert and Alfred Drury. Boehm was instrumental in Gilbert being awarded the commission for the Shaftesbury Memorial Fountain in Piccadilly Circus while both Lantéri and Drury worked in Boehm's studio for a time. Boehm's most famous pupil was the Princess Louise, Duchess of Argyll, daughter of Queen Victoria. She was at his house, at 76 Fulham Road in London, when Boehm died suddenly on 12 December 1890, provoking press speculation about a sexual relationship between the two. According to historian Lucinda Hawksley, the two had a long-lasting love affair.

There is a memorial to Boehm in the crypt of St Paul's Cathedral in London.

Public works

1870–1879

1880–1884

1885–1889

1890 and later

Other works
 Bronze statue of Thomas Baring, 1st Earl of Northbrook, Old Flagstaff House, Barrackpore, India
 Bronze statue of Queen Victoria, a replica of the Windsor Castle statue, erected 1887, Chapeauk Park, Chennai
 Statue of Robert Napier, 1st Baron Napier of Magdala, completed 1880, Barrackpore, India
 Marble bust of Lady Reay, Fanny Georgiana Jane McKay née Hasker, 1890, the Cama and Albless Hospital, Mumbai
 Bronze statue of Lord Dufferin, 1891. Removed from its original site on Dufferin Road, Kolkata, in the early 1970s to an unknown location
 Statue of Ashley Eden, erected in 1887 in Dalhousie Square, Kolkata, and removed during the 1970s
 Marble statue, c. 1882, of John Lawrence, 1st Baron Lawrence, a former Viceroy of India, originally erected in London to some criticism, such that Boehm donated the statue to Lahore. In due course the statue, which shows Lawrence holding both a pen and a sword and has the inscription 'Will you be governed by the pen or the sword ?' was relocated to Foyle College in Ireland.
 Bust of Frank Holl in the Crypt of St Paul's Cathedral, London
 Marble effigy of Walter Montagu Douglas Scott, 5th Duke of Buccleuch in St Mary's Church, Dalkeith begun by Boehm and completed by Alfred Gilbert in 1892.

References

External links

  Images of works by Boehm in the Paul Mellon Centre Photographic Archive

1834 births
1890 deaths
19th-century British sculptors
Alumni of the Heatherley School of Fine Art
Artists from Vienna
Austrian sculptors
Austrian male sculptors
Coin designers
Royal Academicians
Baronets in the Baronetage of the United Kingdom
Naturalised citizens of the United Kingdom